O is the debut studio album by American R&B singer Omarion, released on February 22, 2005 via Epic Records and Sony Urban Music. Despite featuring explicit language, the album doesn't have a Parental Advisory label on the cover. It features three singles: the title track, "Touch" and "I'm Tryna." The album entered at number one on the Billboard 200, and has sold more than 750,000 copies in the United States as of November 2008. O went on to be certified Gold by the Recording Industry Association of America (RIAA) and was nominated for a Grammy Award for Best Contemporary R&B Album at the 48th Grammy Awards.

Critical reception

The album received mixed reviews by critics. Billboard contributor Gail Mitchell praised the collaboration between Omarion and his producers for delivering "a healthy helping of repeat-worthy songs." Jem Aswad of Entertainment Weekly said of the record, "[T]he ballads on this solo debut have way too much whipped cream, but there are some surprisingly tough touches of funk and crunk ("Drop That Heater," the Missy-esque "Take It Off")." AllMusic editor Andy Kellman said that the album works best when the tracks are "lighthearted, summery funk ("Never Gonna Let You Go (She's a Keepa)") and have production done by the Neptunes ("Touch") and Rodney Jerkins ("Drop That Heater") instead of being overly sexual, concluding that "Had Omarion been less concerned with street credibility, realizing that it might be better to allow his young fan base to mature along with him, this debut would've been more than satisfactory." Kathi Kamen Goldmark of Common Sense Media also found the content overdone in its musings of sexual imagery, saying that it sounds "more jarring than seductive", concluding that "[T]here's a lot of potential here, if the artist can come up with some better, more subtly sexy material."

Commercial performance
The album debuted at number one on the US Billboard 200 chart, selling 182,000 copies in its first week of release. In its second week, the album dropped to number eight on the chart, selling an additional 77,000 copies. In its third week, the album fell to number 12 on the chart, selling 45,030 more copies. On March 31, 2005, the album was certified gold by the Recording Industry Association of America (RIAA) for sales of over 500,000 copies in the United States. As of April 2012, the album has sold 765,000 copies in the United States.

Track listing

Notes
 signifies a co-producer
 signifies an additional producer
"I Wish" featured background vocals by Omarion and Quintin Aney.
"O" featured background vocals by Tank and Eric Dawkins.
"I'm Tryna" featured background vocals by Tank and Dawkins.
"Drop That Heater" featured background vocals by Omarion and Sean Garrett.
"Never Gonna Let You Go (She's a Keepa)" featured background vocals by Charles "Charlie" Crawford and Jamie Vick.
"I'm Gon' Change" featured background vocals by Omarion, One Chance and Pierre Medor.

Sample credits
"Never Gonna Let You Go (She's a Keepa)" contains a replay of "Electric Frog (Part II)" as written by Richard Westfield, George Brown, Robert Bell, Ronald Bell, Claydes Smith and Robert Mickens.

Personnel
Adapted from the O media notes.

 Joel Campbell – bass, keyboard
 Carey Drisdom – bass
 Bryan Tate – trumpet
 Ryan Tate – trombone
 Percy Richard, Omarion Grandberry, Marques Houston, Henley Regisford Jr., Chris Stokes – executive producers
 Pharrell, Darkchild, Chris Stokes, Tank, The Underdogs, Sean Garrett, Corna Boyz, AllStar, L.T. Hutton, Paul "Scooby" Smith – producers
 Sean Garrett, Pierre Medor – vocal producers
 Quintin Aney, Durrell Babbs, Charles "Charlie" Crawford, Eric Dawkins, One Chance, Sean Garrett, Pierre Medor – vocal assistance
 David Ashton, Andrew Coleman, Brian Garten, Jaymz Hardy Martin III, Dabling Harward, Sam Lobue II, Chris 'TEK' O'Ryan, Angelo Quaglia, Dave Russell, Brian Summer, Wassim Zreik – engineers
 Kevin Mahoney – assistant engineer
 Kevin "KD" Davis, Jean-Marie Horvat, Dave Russell, Dexter Simmons, Phil Tan – mixing
 Justin Shtuntz, Rob Skipworth – mixing assistance
 Herb Powers – mastering
 Ellen To – art direction
 Kimo Easterwood, Jonathan Mannion, Joaquin Palting – photography

Charts

Weekly charts

Year-end charts

Certifications

See also
 List of Billboard 200 number-one albums of 2005
 List of Billboard number-one R&B albums of 2005

References

2005 debut albums
Omarion albums
Epic Records albums
Sony Urban Music albums
Albums produced by Rodney Jerkins
Albums produced by the Neptunes
Albums produced by the Underdogs (production team)
Albums produced by Sean Garrett
Albums recorded at Record Plant (Los Angeles)